The Education (Schools) Act 1992 set up a system of school inspections by the Office for Standards in Education, Children's Services and Skills (Ofsted). The reports written by independent inspection teams and published by Ofsted are made public and the inspections are carried out according to a National Framework to ensure consistency across the country. Subsequently the legislation was brought together in the School Inspections Act 1996
that designated it to be a six-year cycle.

References 

Education in England
United Kingdom Acts of Parliament 1992
United Kingdom Education Acts